Oriole Beach is an unincorporated community located in Santa Rosa County, Florida, United States on Santa Rosa Sound. It lies east of Gulf Breeze on the Fairpoint Peninsula, and about three miles north of Pensacola Beach. Oriole Beach is part of the Pensacola–Ferry Pass–Brent Metropolitan Statistical Area.

Description 
The main access road is U.S. Route 98, which runs east to west along the peninsula. The community has its roots as a beach cottage fishing retreat for the residents of Pensacola; some of the original cement block beach cottages are still standing. Permanent homes in Oriole Beach were built along Bay Street which follows an old Indian trail and, subsequently, a logging road that was used to harvest live oak trees for the construction of Civil war sailing ships by the Union Navy in the 1860s. The logging road connected to the Andrew Jackson Trail which linked Pensacola with Jacksonville. The Naval Live Oaks Reservation encompasses a portion of the land where the harvesting took place and where some of the live oak trees continue to grow.

Demographics 
According to the U.S. Census Bureau, there were 1,420 people living in Oriole Beach in 2010 and, from 2011–2015, there were 582 household with a median income of 52,208.

History 
In 1985, a homeowners' association was founded in Oriole Beach; it facilitated the construction of a new boat ramp and bicycle path. The bicycle path is part of the W.D. Childers trail that loops approximately 28 miles around the Fairpoint Peninsula. The only school in Oriole Beach, Oriole Beach Elementary School, is part of the Santa Rosa County School District.

Hurricane Ivan made landfall about 30 miles east of Oriole Beach in November 2004. The tidal surge was recorded at 12 feet and the sustained winds were in excess of 120 miles per hour. The Bay Street elevation of Oriole Beach is about 7.0 feet above mean sea level, so some homes on grade were destroyed. Most of the hurricane debris was removed by Santa Rosa County with Federal Emergency Management Agency (FEMA) grant money. As of spring 2007, a few structures and pine trees damaged by Ivan remain to be demolished and removed.

In February 2007, the Bay Street roadway was made three feet wider and about six inches higher by the Santa Rosa County Engineering Department. New home construction is now required by the County Land Development Code to be connected to a sanitary sewer force main rather than septic tanks, the practice before Hurricane Ivan. The city of Gulf Breeze supplies sanitary sewer and natural gas service to the community. Potable water is supplied by a private water system from two elevated tanks connected to local water wells.

References

See also 

Unincorporated communities in Santa Rosa County, Florida
Beaches of Florida
Pensacola metropolitan area
Unincorporated communities in Florida
Census-designated places in Florida
Beaches of Santa Rosa County, Florida
Populated places on the Intracoastal Waterway in Florida